The 1906–07 Scottish Cup was the 34th season of Scotland's most prestigious football knockout competition. The Cup was won by Celtic when they beat Heart of Midlothian 3–0 in the final.

Calendar

First round

First round repeat

First round replay

First round repeat replay

First round second replay

Second round

Second round replay

Second round second replay

Quarter-final

Quarter-final replay

Quarter-final second replay

Semi-finals

Semi-final replay

Semi-final second replay

Final

Teams

See also
1906–07 in Scottish football
Finals played between same clubs:
1901 Scottish Cup Final
1956 Scottish Cup Final
2019 Scottish Cup Final
2020 Scottish Cup Final

References

RSSF Scottish Cup 06-07

Scottish Cup seasons
Cup
Scot